In category theory, the coproduct, or categorical sum, is a construction which includes as examples the disjoint union of sets and of topological spaces, the free product of groups, and the direct sum of modules and vector spaces.  The coproduct of a family of objects is essentially the "least specific" object to which each object in the family admits a morphism.  It is the category-theoretic dual notion to the categorical product,  which means the definition is the same as the product but with all arrows reversed. Despite this seemingly innocuous change in the name and notation, coproducts can be and typically are dramatically different from products.

Definition 

The definition of a coproduct can be extended to an arbitrary family of objects indexed by a set  The coproduct of the family  is an object  together with a collection of morphisms  such that, for any object  and any collection of morphisms  there exists a unique morphism  such that  That is, the following diagram commutes for each :

The coproduct  of the family  is often denoted  or 

Sometimes the morphism  may be denoted  to indicate its dependence on the individual s.

Examples 
The coproduct in the category of sets is simply the disjoint union with the maps ij being the inclusion maps. Unlike direct products, coproducts in other categories are not all obviously based on the notion for sets, because unions don't behave well with respect to preserving operations (e.g. the union of two groups need not be a group), and so coproducts in different categories can be dramatically different from each other. For example, the coproduct in the category of groups, called the free product, is quite complicated. On the other hand, in the category of abelian groups (and equally for vector spaces), the coproduct, called the direct sum, consists of the elements of the direct product which have only finitely many nonzero terms. (It therefore coincides exactly with the direct product in the case of finitely many factors.)

Given a commutative ring R, the coproduct in the category of commutative R-algebras is the tensor product. In the category of (noncommutative) R-algebras, the coproduct is a quotient of the tensor algebra (see free product of associative algebras).

In the case of topological spaces, coproducts are disjoint unions with their disjoint union topologies.  That is, it is a disjoint union of the underlying sets, and the open sets are sets open in each of the spaces, in a rather evident sense.  In the category of pointed spaces, fundamental in homotopy theory, the coproduct is the wedge sum (which amounts to joining a collection of spaces with base points at a common base point).

The concept of disjoint union secretly underlies the above examples: the direct sum of abelian groups is the group generated by the "almost" disjoint union (disjoint union of all nonzero elements, together with a common zero), similarly for vector spaces: the space spanned by the "almost" disjoint union;  the free product for groups is generated by the set of all letters from a similar "almost disjoint" union where no two elements from different sets are allowed to commute.  This pattern holds for any variety in the sense of universal algebra.

The coproduct in the category of Banach spaces with short maps is the  sum, which cannot be so easily conceptualized as an "almost disjoint" sum, but does have a unit ball almost-disjointly generated by the unit ball is the cofactors.

The coproduct of a poset category is the join operation.

Discussion 

The coproduct construction given above is actually a special case of a colimit in category theory. The coproduct in a category  can be defined as the colimit of any functor from a discrete category  into .

As with any universal property, the coproduct can be understood as a universal morphism. Let  be the diagonal functor which assigns to each object  the ordered pair  and to each morphism  the pair .

If  is a set such that all coproducts for families indexed with  exist, then it is possible to choose the products in a compatible fashion so that the coproduct turns into a functor . The coproduct of the family  is then often denoted by 

and the maps  are known as the natural injections.

given by the bijection which maps every tuple of morphisms

(a product in Set, the category of sets, which is the Cartesian product, so it is a tuple of morphisms) to the morphism

That this map is a surjection follows from the commutativity of the diagram: any morphism  is the coproduct of the tuple 

That it is an injection follows from the universal construction which stipulates the uniqueness of such maps. The naturality of the isomorphism is also a consequence of the diagram. Thus the contravariant hom-functor changes coproducts into products.

Suppose all finite coproducts exist in C, coproduct functors have been chosen as above, and 0 denotes the initial object of C corresponding to the empty coproduct. We then have natural isomorphisms

These properties are formally similar to those of a commutative monoid; a category with finite coproducts is an example of a symmetric monoidal category.

If the category has a zero object , then we have a unique morphism  (since  is terminal) and thus a morphism . Since  is also initial, we have a canonical isomorphism  as in the preceding paragraph. This may be extended by induction to a canonical morphism from any finite coproduct to the corresponding product. This morphism need not in general be an isomorphism; in Grp it is a proper epimorphism while in Set* (the category of pointed sets) it is a proper monomorphism. In any preadditive category, this morphism is an isomorphism and the corresponding object is known as the biproduct. A category with all finite biproducts is known as a semiadditive category.

Note that, like the product, this functor is covariant.

See also
Product
Limits and colimits
Coequalizer
Direct limit

References

External links 
Interactive Web page  which generates examples of coproducts in the category of finite sets. Written by Jocelyn Paine.

Limits (category theory)